Jane Holl Lute (born 1956) is an American diplomat and security analyst currently serving as the UN special envoy on the Cyprus dispute. She served as the Deputy Secretary of Homeland Security from 2009 through 2013, after having been confirmed by the U.S. Senate on April 3, 2009. Previously, Lute was the United Nations Assistant Secretary-General for Peacebuilding Support. Before that she was Assistant Secretary-General for Mission Support in the Department of Peacekeeping Operations since August 2003. She is the President and CEO of the Arlington-based Council on CyberSecurity and Senior Advisor of Measure, a Drone as a Service company. On January 5, 2014, she was appointed Special Adviser for Relocation of Camp Hurriya Residents Outside of Iraq by United Nations Secretary-General Ban Ki-moon. On February 8, 2016, she was appointed Special Coordinator on Improving the United Nations Response to Sexual Exploitation and Abuse.

Biography
Lute graduated from Montclair State University in 1978 and received her commission as a U.S. Army second lieutenant through Seton Hall University's ROTC program. She served in the Gulf War during Operation Desert Storm. In addition, she earned an M.A. from the University of Southern California in 1985, a Ph.D. in political science from Stanford University in 1989, and a Juris Doctor from Georgetown University in 2000. She is a member of the Virginia Bar.

From 1991 to 1994, she served as director of European Affairs in the National Security Council staff at the White House. Between 1994 and 1999, Lute headed up the Carnegie Commission on Preventing Deadly Conflict and was a senior public policy fellow at the Woodrow Wilson Centre for International Scholars.

Prior to joining the UN Secretariat, Lute served as Executive Vice President and Chief Operating Officer of the United Nations Foundation and the Better World Fund,  which is established to administer Ted Turner's $1 billion contribution to support the goals of the United Nations.  Before that, she served as Executive Director of the Association of the United States Army's project on the role of American Military Power in 2000.

On January 23, 2009, President Barack Obama announced his intention to nominate Jane Holl Lute as Deputy Secretary of Homeland Security. She was confirmed April 3.  She left the department on April 9, 2013. The Undersecretary for National Protection and Programs Directorate Rand Beers was named as her acting replacement.

Since leaving the Obama administration, Lute has joined as member of the Homeland Security Advisory Council and the World Economic Forum's Global Agenda Council on Cyber Security. She is also part of the Atlantic Council's Task Force on a Transatlantic Digital Agenda, a member of the board of directors of the Center for Internet Security, and a member of the board of directors at the George Washington University's Center for Cyber and Homeland Security. Lute also served as a Founding Partner of Cambridge Global Advisors (CGA), a strategic consulting firm focused on homeland security, national security and cyber security issues.

Lute is married to Lt. Gen. Douglas E. Lute, who was appointed in 2007 as Assistant to the President and Deputy National Security Advisor for Iraq and Afghanistan, and has served as the United States Permanent Representative to NATO from September 3, 2013 to January 20, 2017.

References

External links

1956 births
Living people
American officials of the United Nations
Female United States Army officers
Georgetown University Law Center alumni
Montclair State University alumni
Obama administration personnel
Seton Hall University people
Stanford University alumni
United States Army personnel of the Gulf War
United States Deputy Secretaries of Homeland Security
Commissioners of the Global Commission on the Stability of Cyberspace